The posterior parahippocampal gyrus is a portion of the parahippocampal gyrus.

It can show deterioration in Alzheimer's disease.

References

Gyri